Vaughan House may refer to:

Vaughan House, Adelaide, historic "home for wayward girls" in Adelaide, South Australia
Vaughan House (Little Rock, Arkansas), listed on the NRHP in Little Rock, Arkansas

See also
John Vaughan House, Shandon, Ohio, NRHP-listed
Myrick–Yeates–Vaughan House, Murfreesboro, North Carolina, listed on the NRHP in North Carolina
Rebecca Vaughan House, Courtland, Virginia, NRHP-listed
Rev. Joshua Vaughan House, Coatesville, Pennsylvania, NRHP-listed
Roberts-Vaughan House, Murfreesboro, North Carolina, listed on the NRHP in North Carolina
Vaughan Homestead, Hallowell, Maine, listed on the NRHP in Maine
William Hatchette Vaughan House, Molalla, Oregon, listed on the NRHP in Clackamas County, Oregon